The Northern line is a London Underground line that runs from North London to South London. It is printed in black on the Tube map. The Northern line is unique on the Underground network in having two different routes through central London, two southern branches and two northern branches.

For most of its length it is a deep tube line. About 294 million passenger journeys were recorded in 2016/17 on the Northern line, making it the busiest on the Underground. It has 18 of the system's 31 stations south of the River Thames. There are 52 stations in total on the line, of which 38 have platforms below ground.

The line has a complicated history. The longtime arrangement of two main northern branches, two central branches and the southern unification reflects its genesis as three separate railways, combined in the 1920s and 1930s. An extension in the 1920s used a route originally planned by a fourth company. Abandoned plans from the 1920s to extend the line further southwards, and then northwards in the 1930s, would have incorporated parts of the routes of two further companies. From the 1930s to the 1970s, the tracks of a seventh company were also managed as a branch of the Northern line. An extension of the Charing Cross branch from Kennington to Battersea opened on 20 September 2021, giving the line a second southern branch. There are also proposals to split the line into separate lines following the opening of the new link to Battersea.

History

Formation
See City and South London Railway and Charing Cross, Euston and Hampstead Railway for detailed histories of these companies

The core of the Northern line evolved from two railway companies: the City & South London Railway (C&SLR) and the Charing Cross, Euston & Hampstead Railway (CCE&HR).

The C&SLR, London's first electric hauled deep-level tube railway, was built under the supervision of James Henry Greathead, who had been responsible, with Peter W. Barlow, for the Tower Subway. It was the first of the Underground's lines to be constructed by boring deep below the surface and the first to be operated by electric traction. The railway opened in November 1890 from Stockwell to a now-disused station at King William Street. This was inconveniently placed and unable to cope with the company's traffic so, in 1900, a new route to Moorgate via Bank was opened. By 1907, the C&SLR had been further extended at both ends to run from Clapham Common to Euston.

The CCE&HR (commonly known as the "Hampstead Tube") was opened in 1907 and ran from Charing Cross (known for many years as Strand) via Euston and Camden Town (where there was a junction) to Golders Green and Highgate (now known as Archway). It was extended south by one stop to Embankment in 1914 to form an interchange with the Bakerloo and District lines. In 1913, the Underground Electric Railways Company of London (UERL), owner of the CCE&HR, took over the C&SLR, although they remained separate companies.

Integration
During the early 1920s, a series of works was carried out to connect the C&SLR and CCE&HR tunnels to enable an integrated service to be operated. The first of these new tunnels, between the C&SLR's Euston station and the CCE&HR's station at Camden Town, had originally been planned in 1912, but had been delayed by World War I. Construction began in 1922 and it opened in 1924. The second connection linking the CCE&HR's Embankment and C&SLR's Kennington stations opened in 1926. It provided a new intermediate station at Waterloo to connect to the main line station there and the Bakerloo line. The smaller-diameter tunnels of the C&SLR were also enlarged to match the standard diameter of the CCE&HR and the other deep tube lines.

Extensions
In conjunction with the works to integrate the two lines, two major extensions were undertaken: northwards to Edgware in Middlesex (now in the London Borough of Barnet) and southwards to Morden in Surrey (then in the Merton and Morden Urban District, but now in the London Borough of Merton).

Edgware Extension
The Edgware extension used plans dating back to 1901 for the Edgware and Hampstead Railway (E&HR) which the UERL's subsidiary, the London Electric Railway, had taken over in 1912. It extended the CCE&HR line from its terminus at Golders Green to Edgware in two stages: to Hendon Central in 1923 and to Edgware in 1924. The line crossed open countryside and ran mostly on viaduct from Golders Green to Brent and then on the surface, apart from a short tunnel north of Hendon Central. Five new stations were built to pavilion-style designs by Stanley Heaps, head of the Underground's Architects Office, stimulating the rapid northward expansion of suburban developments in the following years.

Morden Extension
The engineering of the Morden extension of the C&SLR from Clapham Common to Morden was more demanding, running in tunnels to a point just north of Morden station, which was constructed in a cutting. The line then runs under the wide station forecourt and public road outside the station, to the depot. The extension was initially planned to continue to Sutton over part of the route for the unbuilt Wimbledon and Sutton Railway, in which the UERL held a stake, but agreements were made with the Southern Railway to end the extension at Morden. The Southern Railway built the surface line from Wimbledon to Sutton in the 1930s, via South Merton and St. Helier. The tube extension itself opened in 1926, with seven new stations, all designed by Charles Holden in a modern style. Originally, Stanley Heaps was to design the stations, but after seeing these designs Frank Pick, Assistant Joint Manager of the UERL, decided Holden should take over the project.

With the exception of Morden and Clapham South, where more land was available, the new stations were built on confined corner sites at main road junctions in areas that had been already developed. Holden made good use of this limited space and designed striking buildings. The street-level structures are of white Portland Stone with tall double-height ticket halls, with the London Underground roundel made up in coloured glass panels in large glazed screens. The stone columns framing the glass screens are surmounted by a capital formed as a three-dimensional version of the roundel. The large expanses of glass above the entrances ensure that the ticket halls are bright and, lit from within at night, welcoming. The first and last new stations on the extension, Clapham South and Morden, include a parade of shops and were designed with structures capable of being built above (like many of the earlier central London stations). Clapham South was extended upwards soon after its construction with a block of apartments; Morden was extended upwards in the 1960s with a block of offices. All the stations on the extension, except Morden itself, are Grade II listed buildings.

Great Northern & City Railway
After the UERL and the Metropolitan Railway (MR) were brought under public control in the form of the London Passenger Transport Board (LPTB) in 1933, the MR's subsidiary, the Great Northern & City Railway, which ran underground from Moorgate to Finsbury Park, became part of the Underground as the Northern City Line. In preparation for the Northern Heights Plan, it was operated as part of the Northern line, although it was never connected to the rest of the line.

Naming
The resulting line became known as the Morden–Edgware line, although a number of alternative names were also mooted in the fashion of the contraction of Baker Street & Waterloo Railway to "Bakerloo", such as "Edgmor", "Mordenware", "Medgeway" and "Edgmorden". With Egyptology very much in fashion after the discovery of the tomb of Tutankhamun in 1922, there was also a proposal to call the line the Tootancamden Line as it passed through both Tooting and Camden. It was eventually named the Northern line from 28 August 1937, reflecting the planned addition of the Northern Heights lines.

Northern Heights plan

See Edgware, Highgate and London Railway for a detailed history of the company.
In June 1935, the LPTB announced the New Works Programme, an ambitious plan to expand the Underground network which included the integration of a complex of existing London and North Eastern Railway (LNER) lines north of Highgate through the Northern Heights. These lines, built in the 1860s and 1870s by the Edgware, Highgate and London Railway (EH&LR) and its successors, ran from Finsbury Park to Edgware via Highgate, with branches to Alexandra Palace and High Barnet. The line taken over would be extended beyond Edgware to Brockley Hill, Elstree South and Bushey Heath with a new depot at Aldenham. The extension's route was that planned for the unbuilt Watford and Edgware Railway (W&ER), using rights obtained from the earlier purchase of the W&ER (which had long intended an extension of the EH&LR Edgware route towards Watford). This also provided the potential for further extension in the future; Bushey's town planners reserved space in Bushey village for a future station and Bushey Heath station's design was revised several times to ensure this option would remain available in the future.

The project involved electrification of the surface lines (operated by steam trains at the time), the doubling of the original single-line section between Finchley Central and the proposed junction with the Edgware branch of the Northern line, and the construction of three new linking sections of track: a connection between Northern City Line and Finsbury Park station on the surface; an extension from Archway to the LNER line near East Finchley via new deep-level platforms below Highgate station; and a short diversion from just before the LNER's Edgware station to the Underground's station of the same name.

Intended service levels
The peak-hour service pattern was to be 21 trains an hour each way on the High Barnet branch north of Camden Town, 14 of them via the Charing Cross branch and seven via the Bank branch. 14 would have continued on beyond Finchley Central, seven each on the High Barnet and Edgware branches. An additional seven trains an hour would have served the High Barnet branch, but continued via Highgate High-Level and Finsbury Park to Moorgate, a slightly shorter route to the City. It does not seem to have been intended to run through trains to the ex-Northern City branch from Edgware via Finchley Central. Seven trains an hour would have served the Alexandra Palace branch, to/from Moorgate via Highgate High-Level. In addition to the 14 through trains described, the ex-Northern City branch would have had 14 four-car shuttle trains an hour.

Progress of works
Work began in the late 1930s, and was in progress on all fronts by the outbreak of World War II. The tunnelling northwards from the original Highgate station (now Archway) had been completed, and the service to the rebuilt surface station at East Finchley started on 3 July 1939, but without the opening of the intermediate (new) Highgate Station, at the site of the LNER's station of the same name. Further progress was disrupted by the start of the war, though enough had been made to complete the electrification of the High Barnet branch onwards from East Finchley over which tube services started on 14 April 1940; the new (deep-level) Highgate station opened on 19 January 1941. The single track LNER line to Edgware was electrified as far as Mill Hill East, including the Dollis Brook Viaduct, opening as a tube service on 18 May 1941 to serve the barracks there, thus forming the Northern line as it is today. The new depot at Aldenham had already been built and was used to build Halifax bombers. Work on the other elements of the plan was suspended late in 1939.

Work on the extension from Edgware to Bushey Heath including work on a viaduct and a tunnel started in June 1939, but was stopped after war broke out. After the war, the area beyond Edgware was made part of the Metropolitan Green Belt, largely preventing the anticipated residential development in the area, and the potential demand for services from Bushey Heath thus vanished. Passenger numbers also dropped on the then-BR's Mill Hill and Alexandra Palace branches, so it was useless to electrify them. Available funds were directed towards completing the eastern extension of the Central line instead, and the Northern Heights plan was dropped on 9 February 1954. Aldenham depot was converted into an overhaul facility for buses.

The implemented service from High Barnet branch gave good access both to the West End and the City. This appears to have undermined traffic on the Alexandra Palace branch, still run with steam haulage to Kings Cross via Finsbury Park, as Highgate (low-level) was but a short bus ride away and car traffic was much lighter than it would become later. Consequently, the line from Finsbury Park to Muswell Hill and Alexandra Palace via the surface platforms at Highgate was closed altogether to passenger traffic in 1954. This contrasts with the decision to electrify the Epping-Ongar branch of the Central line, another remnant of the New Works programme, run as a tube-train shuttle from 1957. A local pressure group, the Muswell Hill Metro Group, campaigns to reopen this route as a light-rail service. So far there is no sign of movement on this issue: the route, now the Parkland Walk, is highly valued by walkers and cyclists, and suggestions in the 1990s that it could, in part, become a road were met with fierce opposition. Another pressure group has proposed using the track bed further north, as part of the North and West London Light Railway. The connection between Drayton Park and the surface platforms at Finsbury Park was opened in 1976, when the Northern City Line became part of British Rail.

1990s refurbishment and upgrade 
In the 1980s, a southern extension of the line to Peckham was proposed, as part of a review of potential extensions of Underground lines. The proposal was not proceeded with. 

By the early 1990s, the line had deteriorated due to years of under-investment and the use of old rolling stock, most of which dated back to the early 1960s. The line gained the nickname "Misery Line" due to its perceived unreliability. In 1995, a comprehensive refurbishment of the line began – including track replacement, power upgrades, station modernisation (such as Mornington Crescent) and the replacement of older rolling stock with new 1995 Stock thanks to a public–private partnership deal with Alstom.

Recent developments 
Throughout the 2000s, no plans were considered for extending the Northern line, as the PPP to upgrade the Underground did not include provision for line extensions within the PPP contracts. The Northern line was originally scheduled to switch to automatic train operation in 2012, using the same SelTrac S40 system as used since 2009 on the Jubilee line and for a number of years on the Docklands Light Railway. Originally the work was to follow on from the Jubilee line so as to benefit from the experience of installing it there, but that project was not completed until spring 2011. Work on the Northern line was contracted to be completed before the 2012 Olympics. It is now  being undertaken in-house, and TfL predicted the upgrade would be complete by the end of 2014. The first section of the line (West Finchley to High Barnet) was transferred to the new signalling system on 26 February 2013 and the line became fully automated on 1 June 2014 with the Chalk Farm to Edgware via Golders Green section being the last part of the line to switch to ATO.

In January 2018, Transport for London announced that it would double the period during which it runs peak evening services in the central London section to tackle overcrowding. There would now be 24 trains an hour on both central London branches and the northern branches, as well as 30 trains an hour on the Kennington to Morden section between 5pm and 7pm.

24-hour weekend service
Since the mid-autumn of 2016 a 24-hour "Night Tube" service has run on Friday and Saturday nights from Edgware and High Barnet to Morden via the Charing Cross branch; service is suspended on the Bank branch during these times. Trains run every 8 minutes between Morden and Camden Town and every 15/16 minutes between Camden Town and Edgware/High Barnet. Labour disputes delayed the planned start date of September 2015.

Battersea extension

In September 2021, the Northern line was extended to serve the redevelopment of Battersea Power Station. Approved by Wandsworth Council in 2010, and Transport for London in 2014, the construction of the line began in 2015. Tunnelling for the project was completed in 2017, and the extension opened on 20 September 2021. Provision has been made for a future extension to Clapham Junction railway station.

Services

Peak 
As of September 2021, morning peak southbound services are:

4  from Edgware to Kennington via Charing Cross
2 tph from Edgware to Morden via Charing Cross
12 tph from Edgware to Morden via Bank
4 tph from High Barnet to Kennington via Charing Cross
6 tph from High Barnet to Battersea Power Station via Charing Cross
2 tph from High Barnet to Morden via Charing Cross
8 tph from High Barnet to Morden via Bank
1 tph from Mill Hill East to Kennington via Charing Cross
1 tph from Mill Hill East to Battersea Power Station via Charing Cross
2 tph from Mill Hill East to Morden via Bank

This service pattern provides 20 tph between Finchley Central and High Barnet, 4 tph between Finchley Central and Mill Hill East, 6 tph between Kennington and Battersea Power Station and 22 tph everywhere else on the line except between Kennington and Morden, between Camden Town and Finchley Central and on the Edgware branch where there will be 24 tph.

Off-peak 
As of November 2022, off-peak services are the same as peak services, minus the four hourly trains that run from Morden to the northern branches via Charing Cross:

10 tph from Edgware to Kennington via Charing Cross
10 tph from Edgware to Morden via Bank
8 tph from High Barnet to Battersea Power Station via Charing Cross
8 tph from High Barnet to Morden via Bank
2 tph from Mill Hill East to Battersea Power Station via Charing Cross
2 tph from Mill Hill East to Morden via Bank

This service pattern provides 16 tph between Finchley Central and High Barnet, 4 tph between Finchley Central and Mill Hill East, 10 tph between Kennington and Battersea Power Station and 20 tph everywhere else on the line.

Night 
Since 2016, the Northern line has operated Night Tube services on Friday and Saturday nights between the Edgware and High Barnet termini and Morden, via the Charing Cross branch only. Trains run every 15 minutes on each of the northern branches, combining to give eight trains per hour between Camden Town and Morden. There is no Night Tube service on the Mill Hill East, Bank, or Battersea branches.

4 tph from High Barnet to Morden via Charing Cross
4 tph from Edgware to Morden via Charing Cross

Map

Stations

Open stations

High Barnet branch

Edgware branch

Camden Town

Charing Cross branch

Bank branch

Kennington

Battersea branch

Morden branch

Closed stations

Permanently closed stations
 King William Street (closed 1900, replaced by Bank)
 City Road (closed 1922)
 South Kentish Town (closed 1924)
 North End (also known as Bull & Bush - never opened – work stopped 1906)

Resited stations
 Stockwell – new platforms resited immediately to the south of its predecessor with the 1922–1924 upgrade of the line.
 London Bridge – the northbound tunnel and platform converted into a concourse, and a new northbound tunnel and platform built in the late 1990s to increase the platform and circulation areas in preparation for the opening of the Jubilee line.

Abandoned plans
Northern Heights stations not transferred from LNER
 Highgate – High-level only
 Stroud Green
 Crouch End
 Cranley Gardens
 Muswell Hill
 Alexandra Palace
 Mill Hill (The Hale)

Bushey Extension stations not constructed
 Brockley Hill
 Elstree South
 Bushey Heath

Infrastructure

Rolling stock

When the line opened, it was served by 1906 Stock. These were replaced by 1938 stock as part of the New Works Programme, later supplemented with identical 1949 Stock. When the Piccadilly line was extended to Heathrow Airport in the 1970s, its 1959 Stock and 1956 Stock (prototypes of the 1959 Stock) trains were transferred to the Northern line. As there were not enough 1956 and 1959 Stock trains to replace the Northern line's 1938 Stock fleet, they were supplemented with newly built 1972 Mark 1 Stock trains, which all served the line at the same time. A few 1972 Mark 2 stock trains also ran on this line until going to the Jubilee and now the Bakerloo where they remain in service. The few 1956 Stock trains were briefly replaced by 1962 Stock transferred from the Central line in 1995, before the entire Northern line fleet was replaced with 1995 Stock between 1997 and 1999.

Today, all Northern line trains consist of 1995 Stock in the Underground livery of red, white and blue. In common with the other deep-level lines, the trains are the smaller of the two loading gauges used on the system. 1995 stock has automated announcements and quick-close doors. If the proposed split of the line takes place (initial estimates of 2018 having been abandoned to focus on completion of the Battersea and Nine Elms extension work), 19 new trains will be added to the existing fleet of 106 trains, though additional trains beyond the extra 19 trains may be required to provide a full service for the new Battersea extension.

Tunnels
Although two other London Underground lines operate fully underground, the Northern line is unusual in that it is a deep-level tube line that serves the outer suburbs of South London yet there is only one station above ground (Morden tube station) while the rest of this part of the line is deep below ground. The short section to Morden depot is also above ground. This is partly because its southern extension into the outer suburbs was not done by taking over an existing surface line as was generally the case with routes like the Central, Jubilee and Piccadilly lines. Apart from the core central underground tunnels, part of the section between Hendon and Colindale is also underground. As bicycles are not allowed in tunnel sections (even if no station is in that section) as they would hinder evacuation, they are limited to High Barnet – East Finchley, the Mill Hill East branch, Edgware – Colindale and Hendon Central – Golders Green. There are also time-based restrictions for the sections where bicycles are allowed.

The tunnel from Morden to East Finchley via Bank, 17 miles 528 yards (27.841 km), was for a time the longest in the world. The Channel Tunnel linking the UK and France together is now longer.

Depots
The Northern line is serviced by four depots. The main one is at Golders Green, adjacent to Golders Green tube station, while the second, at Morden, is south of Morden tube station and is the larger of the two. The other two are at Edgware and Highgate. The Highgate depot is on the former LNER branch to Alexandra Palace. There was originally a depot at Stockwell but it closed in 1915. There are sidings at High Barnet for stabling trains overnight.

Future

Northern line split
Since the 2000s, TfL has aspired to split the Northern line into two separate routes. Running trains between all combinations of branches and the two central sections, as at present, means only 24 trains an hour can run through each of the central sections at peak times, because merging trains have to wait for each other at the junctions at Camden Town and Kennington. Completely segregating the routes could allow 36 trains an hour on all parts of the line, increasing capacity by around 25%. 

TfL has already separated the Charing Cross and Bank branches during off-peak periods; however, four trains per hour still run to and from Morden via Charing Cross in the peak; the northern branches to Edgware and High Barnet cannot be separated until Camden Town station is upgraded to cope with the numbers of passengers changing trains. The extension to Battersea would allow the Charing Cross branch to terminate at Battersea Power Station.

Camden Town station upgrade and expansion 
The proposed split of the Northern line would require Camden Town station to be expanded and upgraded, as the station is already severely overcrowded at weekend peak times, and that a split would increase numbers of passengers wishing to change trains at the station. In 2005, London Underground failed to secure planning permission for a comprehensive upgrade plan for Camden Town tube station that would have involved demolition of the existing station entrance and several other surface-level buildings, all within a conservation area. New redevelopment plans were first announced in 2013 by TfL, which proposed avoided the existing station entrance and the conservation area by building a second entrance and interchange tunnels to the north, mostly on the site of a subsequently vacated infant school. In 2018, plans to upgrade and rebuild Camden Town station were placed indefinitely on hold, due to TfL's financial situation. , there is currently no plan to split the line.

Incidents and accidents
In October 2003, a train derailed at Camden Town. Although no one was hurt, points, signals and carriages were damaged. Concern was raised about the safety of the Tube, given the derailment at Chancery Lane earlier in 2003. A joint report by the Underground and its maintenance contractor Tube Lines concluded that poor track geometry was the main cause, and therefore extra friction arising out of striations (scratches) on a newly installed set of points had allowed the leading wheel of the last carriage to climb the rail and  derail. The track geometry at the derailment site is a very tight bend and tight tunnel bore, which precludes the normal solution for this sort of geometry of canting the track by raising the height of one rail relative to the other.

In August 2010, a defective rail grinding train caused disruption on the Charing Cross branch, after it travelled four miles in 13 minutes without a driver. The train was being towed to the depot after becoming faulty. At Archway station, the defective train became detached and ran driverless until coming to a stop at an incline near Warren Street station.  This caused morning rush-hour services to be suspended on this branch. All passenger trains were diverted via the Bank branch, with several not stopping at stations until they were safely on the Bank branch.

In popular culture
 In his debut novel Ghostwritten, David Mitchell characterises the Northern line as "the psycho of the family".
 The Bloc Party song "Waiting For the 7.18" references the Northern line as "the loudest".
 As part of a series of twelve books tied to the twelve lines of the London Underground, A Northern Line Minute focuses on the Northern line.
 The Nick Drake song "Parasite" references the Northern Line.
It is also referred to in The New Vaudeville Band song "Finchley Central" and the Squeeze song "853-5937"
 The 1982 Robyn Hitchcock song "Fifty Two Stations" begins, "There's fifty-two stations on the Northern Line/None of them is yours, one of them is mine."

Maps

High Barnet – 
Totteridge & Whetstone – 
Woodside Park – 
West Finchley – 
Mill Hill East – 
Finchley Central – 
East Finchley – 
Highgate – 
Archway – 
Tufnell Park – 
Kentish Town – 
Edgware – 
Burnt Oak – 
Colindale – 
Hendon Central – 
Brent Cross – 
Golders Green – 
Hampstead – 
Belsize Park – 
Chalk Farm – 
Camden Town – 
Mornington Crescent – 
Euston – 
Warren Street – 
Goodge Street – 
Tottenham Court Road – 
Leicester Square – 
Charing Cross – 
Embankment – 
Waterloo – 
King's Cross St Pancras – 
Angel – 
Old Street – 
Moorgate – 
Bank-Monument – 
London Bridge – 
Borough – 
Elephant & Castle – 
Kennington – 
Oval – 
Stockwell – 
Clapham North – 
Clapham Common – 
Clapham South – 
Balham – 
Tooting Bec – 
Tooting Broadway – 
Colliers Wood – 
South Wimbledon – 
Morden – 
Golders Green depot – 
Morden depot –

See also
 T. P. Figgis, architect of the City and South London Railway's original stations
 Leslie Green, architect of the Charing Cross, Euston and Hampstead Railway's early stations
 List of crossings of the River Thames
 London deep-level shelters, most of which are under Northern line stations
 Tunnels underneath the River Thames

Explanatory footnotes

References

Notes

Citations

Bibliography

External links

 
 
 Above-ground route of line from Morden to Edgware, constructed from Google StreetView
 Architectural history of London Underground during 1920-30s from the Royal Institute of British Architects
 Old Street, Angel and Stockwell stations
 South Clapham, Tooting Bec and South Wimbledon

London Underground lines
Automatic London Underground lines
Railway lines opened in 1890
Transport in the London Borough of Barnet
Transport in the London Borough of Haringey
Transport in the London Borough of Islington
Transport in the London Borough of Camden
Transport in the City of Westminster
Transport in the City of London
Transport in the London Borough of Southwark
Transport in the London Borough of Lambeth
Transport in the London Borough of Wandsworth
Transport in the London Borough of Merton
Tunnels underneath the River Thames
Standard gauge railways in London
Articles containing video clips